The Continental Association of African Neurosurgical Societies (CAANS)  is the continental, non-governmental, learned society representing the neurosurgeons of African region. It is one of the 5 Continental Associations (AANS, AASNS, CAANS, EANS and FLANC) of the World Federation of Neurosurgical Societies (WFNS).

References 

Learned societies
Medical and health organizations
Neurosurgery organizations
Organizations based in Africa